Events from the year 1806 in Ireland.

Events
10 April – Sir Arthur Wellesley marries Kitty Pakenham, daughter of the Earl of Longford, in the temporary St. George's Church built on Whitworth Road in Dublin.
 American engraver Henry Pelham, agent for Lord Lansdowne's Irish estates, is drowned from a boat while superintending the erection of a martello tower in the Kenmare River.

Arts and literature
John Wilson Croker (anonymously) publishes his mock-heroic verse satire on Dublin socio-political life The Amazoniad; or, Figure and Fashion.
Sydney Owenson publishes her epistolary novel The Wild Irish Girl: a National Tale.
Samuel Thomson publishes his third volume of verse Simple Poems on a Few Subjects.
The English architect George Papworth moves to Dublin.

Births
21 January – William Quarter, first Roman Catholic bishop of Chicago (died 1848).
25 January – Daniel Maclise, painter (died 1870).
10 May - James Shields, Irish American politician and United States Army officer (died 1879 in the United States)
31 May – Patrick Leahy, Archbishop of Cashel (died 1875).
25 July – John O'Donovan, scholar and first historic topographer (died 1861).
1 August – Edward Crofton, 2nd Baron Crofton, Conservative politician (died 1869).
17 August – Peter Richard Kenrick, first Catholic archbishop west of the Mississippi River (died 1896).
20 August – Archibald Acheson, 3rd Earl of Gosford, Member of Parliament for Armagh (died 1864).
31 August – Charles Lever, novelist (died 1872).
September – Samuel Davidson, biblical scholar (died 1898).
15 October – William Clements, 3rd Earl of Leitrim, nobleman and landowner (died 1878).
3 November – Robert Molesworth, judge in Australia (died 1890).
4 December – John T. Graves, mathematician (died 1870).
Full date unknown
Simon Byrne, prize-fighter (died 1833).

Deaths
22 February – James Barry, painter (born 1741).
31 May – George Macartney, 1st Earl Macartney, statesman, colonial administrator and diplomat (born 1737).
9 September – William Paterson, jurist in the United States (born 1745).
18 September – Patrick Cotter O'Brien, known as the Bristol Giant and the Irish Giant (born 1760).

References

 
Years of the 19th century in Ireland
Ireland